Don Barnes is the current Sheriff-Coroner of Orange County, California. He was elected to the position on November 5, 2018, and sworn in on January 7, 2019, replacing Sheriff Sandra Hutchens. Barnes was endorsed by then-Sheriff Sandra Hutchens shortly after she announced that she would not seek re-election.

Career
Barnes was sworn in as a Deputy Sheriff in 1989. Barnes rose through the ranks of the department. In 2016, he was sworn in as Undersheriff. In 2018, then Sheriff Sandra Hutchens announced that she would not seek re-election to a third term. She endorsed Barnes for the position. Barnes defeated Duke Nguyen in the 2018 General election. Barnes was sworn in as the 15th Sheriff-Coroner on January 9, 2019.

References

External links

California sheriffs
Living people
Year of birth missing (living people)
People from Orange County, California